John Leary may refer to:

 John Leary (politician) (1837–1905), businessman, mayor of Seattle (1884–1885)
 John Leary (baseball) (1891–1961), 1910s baseball player
 John Leary (cricketer) (1867-1940), Australian cricketer
 Jack Leary (1857–1905), 1880s baseball player
 John J. Leary Jr. (1874–1944), American journalist
 Scott Leary (John Scott Leary, 1881–1958), American swimmer
 John P. Leary (died 1993), Jesuit priest, president of Gonzaga University (1961–1969)
 John Leary (actor), Australian theatre and television actor (active from 1990s through present), Kangaroo Creek Gang and others
 John S. Leary (1845–1904), American lawyer and politician
 John Frederic Leary (1798–1861), British librarian and antiquarian

See also
 John O'Leary (disambiguation)